Janice E. Cooper is an American politician from Maine. Cooper, a Democrat from Yarmouth, Maine, has served in the Maine House of Representatives since December 2012.

References

Year of birth missing (living people)
Living people
People from Yarmouth, Maine
Vassar College alumni
Yale Law School alumni
Democratic Party members of the Maine House of Representatives
Women state legislators in Maine
Maine lawyers
21st-century American politicians
21st-century American women politicians